Chris Honeycutt (born July 25, 1988) is an American mixed martial artist who formerly fought in Bellator's Middleweight division.

Background
Born in Brook Park, Ohio, Honeycutt began wrestling at the age of four. Honeycutt attended North Andover High School in Massachusetts for two years before moving and transferring schools to St. Edward High School in Ohio, being coached by Greg Urbas. At North Andover, Honeycutt finished second in the state tournament and finished the season with a record of 32–1 with the loss coming in the state final. As a sophomore, Honeycutt won the Massachusetts state championship. At St. Edward's, Honeycutt placed third in the state tournament and then went undefeated and won the state championship again for his senior season. Honeycutt finished with an overall high school record of 154-10 and was also a member of the 2006 Junior National team. Honeycutt continued his wrestling career at Edinboro University where he was a two-time NCAA Division I All-American. A fan of mixed martial arts, Honeycutt soon began his career after college. Honeycutt also had brief training in boxing as well as Tae Kwon Do before embarking on a career in MMA.

Mixed martial arts career

Early career: Up and Comers Unlimited
Honeycutt made his professional MMA debut on January 26, 2013, defeating Jesse Torres via first-round TKO in the Up and Comers Unlimited promotion.

After another first-round stoppage win, Honeycutt faced Manny Murillo for the vacant UPC middleweight championship at UPC Unlimited: Up & Comers 16 on July 20, 2013. He won the fight via unanimous decision after five rounds to become the UPC middleweight champion.

Honeycutt successfully defended his title once, defeating Jake Gallagher via TKO due to punches in the first round at UPC Unlimited: Up & Comers 18 on January 4, 2014.

Battlegrounds MMA
Honeycutt was expected to compete in the Battlegrounds MMA single night 8-man tournament on October 3, 2014. However, in September it was announced that him, along with Dennis Hallman, were removed from the welterweight bracket and replaced by Jesse Taylor and Joe Ray.

Bellator MMA

Welterweight
Honeycutt made his welterweight and Bellator debut at Bellator 125 against Ultimate Fighter 12 contestant Aaron Wilkinson on September 19, 2014. Honeycutt won the fight via TKO in the second round.

Honeycutt faced Clayton MacFarlane at Bellator 133 on February 13, 2015. He won the fight via TKO in the third round.

In his third fight for the promotion, Honeycutt faced Paul Bradley at Bellator 140 on July 17, 2015.  The fight ended midway through the second round after an accidental clash of heads between the two fighters, resulting in a cut on Bradley that the doctor deemed too bad to allow the fighter to continue.  The official result was a No Contest.   A rematch with Bradley was held on January 29, 2016, at Bellator 148.  Despite again being the betting favorite, Honeycutt lost the bout via TKO early in the first round, resulting in the first loss of his MMA career.

After his first loss, Honeycutt returned to face Matt Secor at Bellator 153 on April 22, 2016. He won the fight via unanimous decision.

Return to middleweight
Honeycutt returned to the middleweight division and faced Mikkel Parlo at Bellator 156 on June 17, 2016. Honeycutt won the fight via unanimous decision.

Honeycutt faced Ben Reiter at Bellator 166 on December 2, 2016. He won the fight via unanimous decision.

Honeycutt faced Kevin Casey at Bellator 182 on August 25, 2017. He won the fight via TKO in the second round.

Honeycutt faced Rafael Lovato Jr. at Bellator 189 on December 1, 2017. He lost the fight by unanimous decision.

Honeycutt faced Leo Leite at Bellator 202 on July 13, 2018. He won the fight via unanimous decision, getting three 30–25 score cards from the judges.

Absolute Championship Akhmat 
Honeycutt faced Alexander Shlemenko at Eastern Economic Forum: Roscongress Vladivostok Combat Night on September 15, 2019. He won the fight via unanimous decision.

Honeycutt faced Azamat Bekoev on April 23, 2021, at ACA 122. He lost the bout via rear-naked choke in the second round.

Honeycutt faced Arbi Agujev on September 11, 2021, at ACA 128. He won the bout via unanimous decision.

Honeycutt faced Nikola Dipchikov at November 18, 2021 at ACA 132: Johnson vs. Vakhaev. He lost the bout after getting knocked out via elbows from the bottom.

Honeycutt faced Vasily Kurochkin on March 9, 2023 at ACA 153: Dzhanaev vs. Pessoa, winning the bout via unanimous decision.

Championships and accomplishments

Mixed martial arts
Up and Comers Unlimited
UPC Middleweight Championship (one time)
One successful title defense

Mixed martial arts record

|-
|Win
|align=center|14–5 (1)
|Vasily Kurochkin
|Decision (unanimous)
|ACA 153: Dzhanaev vs. Pessoa
|
|align=center|3
|align=center|5:00
|Moscow, Russia
|
|-
| Loss
| align=center|13–5 (1)
|Nikola Dipchikov
|KO (elbows)
|ACA 132: Johnson vs. Vakhaev
|
|align=center|1
|align=center|1:31
|Minsk, Belarus
|
|-
|Win
|align=center| 13–4 (1)
| Arbi Agujev
| Decision (unanimous)
|ACA 128: Goncharov vs. Omielańczuk
|
|align=center|3
|align=center|5:00
|Minsk, Belarus
|
|-
| Loss
| align=center|
| Azamat Bekoev
| Submission (rear-naked choke)
|ACA 122: Johnson vs. Poberezhets
|
|align=center|2
|align=center|4:33
|Minsk, Belarus
| 
|-
|Win
|align=center| 12–3 (1)
|Alexander Shlemenko
|Decision (unanimous)
|Eastern Economic Forum: Roscongress Vladivostok Combat Night
|
|align=center|5
|align=center|5:00
|Vladivostok, Russia
|
|-
|Loss
|align=center| 11–3 (1)
|Costello van Steenis
| Decision (split)
|Bellator 210
|
|align=center| 3
|align=center| 5:00
|Thackerville, Oklahoma, United States
|
|-
|Win
|align=center| 11–2 (1)
|Leo Leite
| Decision (unanimous)
|Bellator 202
|
|align=center| 3
|align=center| 5:00
|Thackerville, Oklahoma, United States
|
|-
|Loss
|align=center| 10–2 (1)
|Rafael Lovato Jr.
| Decision (unanimous)
|Bellator 189
|
|align=center| 3
|align=center| 5:00
|Thackerville, Oklahoma, United States
|
|-
|Win
|align=center| 10–1 (1)
|Kevin Casey
|TKO (punches)
|Bellator 182
|
|align=center|2
|align=center|2:06
|Verona, New York, United States
|
|-
|Win
|align=center| 9–1 (1)
|Ben Reiter
|Decision (unanimous)
|Bellator 166
|
|align=center| 3
|align=center| 5:00
|Thackerville, Oklahoma, United States
|
|-
|Win
|align=center| 8–1 (1)
|Mikkel Parlo
|Decision (unanimous)
|Bellator 156
|
|align=center| 3
|align=center| 5:00
|Fresno, California, United States
| 
|-
|Win
|align=center| 7–1 (1)
|Matt Secor
|Decision (unanimous)
|Bellator 153
|
|align=center| 3
|align=center| 5:00
|Uncasville, Connecticut, United States
| 
|-
|Loss
|align=center| 6–1 (1)
|Paul Bradley
|TKO (punches)
|Bellator 148
|
|align=center| 1
|align=center| 0:40
|Fresno, California, United States
| 
|-
|NC
|align=center| 6–0 (1)
|Paul Bradley
|NC (accidental headbutt)
|Bellator 140
|
|align=center| 2
|align=center| 2:47
|Uncasville, Connecticut, United States
| 
|-
|Win
|align=center| 6–0
|Clayton MacFarlane
|TKO (body punches)
|Bellator 133
|
|align=center| 3
|align=center| 4:16
|Fresno, California, United States
| 
|-
|Win
|align=center|5–0
|Aaron Wilkinson
|TKO (punches)
|Bellator 125
|
|align=center|2
|align=center|4:45
|Fresno, California, United States
|
|-
|Win
|align=center|4–0
|Jake Gallagher
|TKO (punches)
|UPC Unlimited: Up & Comers 18
|
|align=center|1
|align=center|2:11
|Rancho Mirage, California, United States
|
|-
|Win
|align=center|3–0
|Manny Murillo
|Decision (unanimous)
|UPC Unlimited: Up & Comers 16
|
|align=center|5
|align=center|5:00
|Rancho Mirage, California, United States
|
|-
|Win
|align=center|2–0
|Richard Blake
|Submission (rear-naked choke)
|UPC Unlimited: Up & Comers 15
|
|align=center|1
|align=center|2:20
|Fresno, California, United States
|
|-
|Win
|align=center|1–0
|Jesse Torres
|TKO (punches)
|UPC Unlimited: Up & Comers 14: The Experience
|
|align=center|1
|align=center|1:16
|Palm Springs, California, United States
|

References

Living people
1988 births
American male mixed martial artists
Welterweight mixed martial artists
Mixed martial artists utilizing collegiate wrestling
Mixed martial artists utilizing boxing
Mixed martial artists utilizing taekwondo
American male sport wrestlers
Amateur wrestlers
American male taekwondo practitioners
People from Cuyahoga County, Ohio